Glasson railway station was a railway station in Glasson, Cumbria, England. It was the last station before the terminus on the Port Carlisle Railway branch, serving the small village of that name. Nothing now remains of the station.

History 
A port was built in 1819 at Port Carlisle and in 1821, the eleven and a half mile long Carlisle Navigation Canal was built to take goods to Carlisle. The canal was closed in 1853 and the canal basin at Carlisle and parts of the canal were filled in by the Port Carlisle Railway Company who constructed a railway that started passenger services in 1854, discontinuing them two years later when the Carlisle & Silloth Bay Railway & Dock Company's (C&SBRDC) new railway to Silloth opened, utilising the Port Carlisle Branch as far as Drumburgh. A brief resurgence of business at Port Carisle had taken place upon the opening of the railway, taken away however by the new port at Silloth and the transfer of the steamer service to Liverpool.

To reduce costs a horse-drawn service was provided in 1856 between Drumburgh, Glasson, and Port Carlisle for a number of years. The horse-drawn train did not always stop and the passengers were sometimes obliged to carefully jump off; not so difficult as its sounds for 3rd Class passengers as they sat outside on benches. The last horse-drawn train ran on Saturday, 4 April 1914  and the first steam-powered train ran on 6 April 1914. In an attempt to stave off closure one of the first steam railmotors was built and this service to Port Carlisle railway station via Glasson from Drumburgh lasted until the branch was closed in 1932. Freight services had been withdrawn in 1899.

The construction of the Solway railway viaduct of the Solway Junction Railway caused Port Carlisle harbour to silt up and lose trade; this contributed to the abandonment of the Port Carlisle to Carlisle railway via Glasson. The Port Carlisle Railway Company had agreed to supply a locomotive if the C&SBRDC provided rolling stock. The North British Railway leased the line from 1862, it was absorbed by them in 1880, and then taken over by the London and North Eastern Railway in 1923.

Infrastructure
The station sat close to the village, reached by an entrance off one side of the overbridge; it had a single short platform and a small shelter. No sidings were present. At Canal Junction the Port Carlisle line made an end on junction with the earlier goods branch from London Road and it was this section on to Drumburgh (pronounced drum-bruff) that was taken over by the Carlisle & Silloth Bay Railway & Dock Company. Immediately west of Drumburgh station the line branched off from the line to Silloth, passing under a minor road to Port Carlisle. The branch ran close to the south bank of the Solway Firth and the course of Hadrians Wall at Glasson and elsewhere, heading over low ground to the terminus of the line at Port Carlisle.

The old overbridge, built in 1819–23, in Glasson (NY254606) is a listed structure. It was originally built as a bridge over canal. It has a cast-iron parapet. The Plinth with rounded corners was originally the supporting structure for the canal drawbridge, increased in height to convert it to a railway bridge. An old canal lock keepers cottage also survives.

Micro-history
Port Carlisle was one and a quarter miles away by train and Drumburgh was also one and a quarter miles away. The journey time was around four minutes, although Glasson was a request stop.

Four horse-drawn 'Dandy cars' built by the North British Railway. The Dandy car was originally preserved at Carlisle, before being moved to the National Railway Museum at York. The Port Carlisle line became a day tourist attraction to Carlisle Victorians.

The 'Flower of Yarrow' Sentinel Railcar used on the line was driven by James Grey with T. Jackson as the fireman worked on the Port Carlisle Railway in 1932 before its final closure.

References 
Notes

Sources

External links
 Railway bridge in Glasson Cumbria Gazetteer
 Glasson station in 1908 flickr
 1866 6" OS map of the station National Library of Scotland
 Edwardian 6" OS map of the station National Library of Scotland
 The branch from Drumburgh with mileages Railway Codes
 The station and line Rail Map Online

Disused railway stations in Cumbria
Former North British Railway stations
Railway stations in Great Britain opened in 1854
Railway stations in Great Britain closed in 1917
Railway stations in Great Britain opened in 1919
Railway stations in Great Britain closed in 1932
1854 establishments in England
1932 disestablishments in England